Around the World is the fourteenth studio album by German band Bad Boys Blue. It was released on 4 August 2003 by Koch Universal. There was also one single released for this record, "Lover on the Line". John McInerney performed all the songs.

The group became a duo again and left Coconut Records. This album is the last one where John McInerney and Andrew Thomas perform together.

Track listing
"Around The World" – 3:52   
"Cold As Ice" – 4:18   
"Baby Come Home" – 3:08   
"Think About You" – 4:15   
"Lover On The Line" – 3:49   
"A Bridge Of Heartaches" – 3:59   
"Join The Bad Boys Blue" – 3:02   
"Babe" – 3:48   
"Heaven Or Hell" – 3:58   
"I'm Your Lover" – 3:38   
"I'm Living For Your Love" – 3:45   
"Only One Breath Away" – 3:58   
"Around The World (Remix)" – 3:45   
"Lover On The Line (Extended Version)" – 7:17

Chart performance

Personnel
Bad Boys Blue 
John McInerney – Lead vocal (all tracks)
Andrew Thomas – Rap parts (9)

Additional personnel
Arranged by David Brandes (tracks: 2), Domenico Labarile (tracks: 1 2 6 7 9 10 11 13), Domenico Livarano (tracks: 5 12 14), Hans Steingen (tracks: 8), Juergen Fritz (tracks: 1 3 4) 
Backing vocals – David Brandes, Lydia Madajewski 
Lyrics by Chris Norman (tracks: 9), David Brandes (tracks: 6), John McInerney (tracks: 3 6), John O' Flynn (tracks: 1 to 5, 7 to 14) 
Mixed by Gary Jones (tracks: 1 to 5, 7 to 14), Milan Saje (tracks: 6) 
Music by David Brandes, Jane Tempest 
Photography by Karsten Koch 
Producer – David Brandes 
Recorded by Alwin Groll, David Brandes

References

External links
ALBUM - Around The World
Bad Boys Blue – General Information

2003 albums
Bad Boys Blue albums